Beijing Bus FC (Simplified Chinese: 北京巴士足球俱乐部) is a Chinese football club its based in Beijing, China. Beijing Bus Football Club is a disbanded Chinese semi-professional football club. The team has participated in the 2006 China League Two. The club president is Wang Jiesen. The club was formed by Beijing Bus Co., Ltd., and its comprehensive strength is not strong in the second division. The only time the team appeared in the second division was in the 2006 season, and only the fifth place in the North Division lost the qualification to advance to the knockout stage.
The club is jointly invested by Beijing Bus Football Club and Beijing Bafangda Passenger Transport Co., Ltd. to establish Beijing Bus Football Club Co., Ltd., Beijing Bus Investment of 2.4 million yuan, accounting for 80% of the company's registered capital, Beijing Bafangda Passenger Transport Co., Ltd. investment 600,000 yuan, accounting for 20% of the company's registered capital, comprehensive strength is not strong in the second division. The main venue is located in Beijing Chaolai Sports Activity Center.

References

External links
 http://www.bjbus.com/

Defunct football clubs in China
Football clubs in Beijing
Association football clubs established in 2004
2004 establishments in China
2006 disestablishments in China
Association football clubs disestablished in 2006
Defunct football clubs in Beijing